Todd Matthew Doxzon (born March 28, 1975) is a former American football wide receiver who played one season with the Miami Dolphins of the National Football League. He played quarterback at Iowa State University and attended Millard North High School in Omaha, Nebraska. He was also a member of the Amsterdam Admirals, Los Angeles Xtreme, New York Dragons, Carolina Cobras and Georgia Force. Notable for his extremely quick 40 yd dash times.

References

External links
Just Sports Stats
College stats
XFL profile

Living people
1975 births
Players of American football from Iowa
American football wide receivers
American football quarterbacks
Iowa State Cyclones football players
Miami Dolphins players
Amsterdam Admirals players
Los Angeles Xtreme players
New York Dragons players
Carolina Cobras players
Georgia Force players
Sportspeople from Sioux City, Iowa